Reneé J. Rapp is an American actress and singer. After she won the 2018 Jimmy Award for Best Performance by an Actress, she took over the role of Regina George in the Broadway musical Mean Girls. She then went on to play Leighton in the HBO Max comedy series The Sex Lives of College Girls. In November 2022, her EP Everything to Everyone was released. In February 2023, a deluxe version of her EP Everything to Everyone was released, featuring two new songs.

Early life and education 
Rapp attended high school at Hopewell High School in Huntersville, North Carolina, for three years, performing in the theater program and playing on the varsity women's golf team before transferring to Northwest School of the Arts. Corey Mitchell, Rapp's theater teacher, said Rapp "has a special distinction...There is a difference when that vocal ability is coupled with sincere emotions that can move an audience and that literally can excite an audience".

In 2018, Rapp won the Best Actress award at the Blumey Awards, Charlotte's premiere musical theater awards, for her portrayal of Sandra in her school's production of Big Fish. Rapp then attended the tenth annual Jimmy Awards in New York City, where she ultimately won “Best Performance by an Actress", beating forty other competitors for the award. This win earned her a $10,000 scholarship. Actress Laura Benanti, who presented the award to Rapp, said, "I will never be as confident as that 18-year-old". Additionally, the New York Magazine coverage of the Jimmy Awards claimed that Rapp "set the stage ablaze" with her winning performance, "prompting the stars of Mean Girls to collectively start sleeping with one eye open".

Career 
Following her Jimmy Award win, Rapp was cast as Wendla in Theatre Charlotte's 2018 production of Spring Awakening. On July 27, 2018, Rapp performed at the 2018 Supergirl Pro Surf and Music Festival. On September 23, 2018, she took part in The Educational Theatre Foundation's fourth annual Broadway Back to School event held at Feinstein's/54 Below. In December 2018, she read for the role of Monteen in Roundabout Theatre Company's reading of Parade. On January 12, 2019, Rapp performed at BroadwayCon's 2019 Star to Be event, singing "They Just Keep Moving the Line" from NBC's Smash. She was next seen on March 4, 2019, performing at Feinstein's/54 Below's 54 Sings The High School Musical Trilogy, followed by their FOR THE GIRLS event on March 28.

On May 28, 2019, it was announced that Rapp would be taking over the role of Regina George in the Tony Award-nominated Broadway musical, Mean Girls, first for a limited run from June 7–26, then permanently starting September 10, 2019. On June 3, Rapp performed at The Green Room 42, singing songs from the show after an introduction by Tina Fey. The production closed on March 12, 2020, in accordance with Broadway's shutdown; it was later announced on January 7, 2021, that the show would not reopen.

On October 14, 2020, Rapp was cast as Leighton, one of the four leads in Mindy Kaling's HBO Max series The Sex Lives of College Girls.

On November 14, 2022, Rapp announced her first tour; "Everything to Everyone: The First Shows." There were four tour dates across the United States, in Los Angeles, Manhattan, Boston, and Atlanta. Due to high ticket demand, there was a new date added in Brooklyn as well as extra shows in Los Angeles and Manhattan, and an upgraded venue in Atlanta. Rapp's sold-out US tour ran from December 6–18, 2022, with a total of 8 shows.

On December 9, 2022, it was announced that Rapp would reprise her role as Regina George in a film adaptation, Mean Girls: The Musical.

On January 12, Rapp announced her first international performance of her EP 'Everything to Everyone’. On January 19, she performed a three time venue upgraded sold out show at the O2 Forum Kentish Town.

Personal life 
Rapp stated in an interview that she takes "her inspiration from classic pop and R&B music, and mixes it all with her current favorites, Jazmine Sullivan and Yebba". Reneé said that one of her favourite artist and inspirations is Jennifer Hudson (aka J.Hud) and they sang together one of J.Hud songs on the 27th of January, 2022. They sang "In love With Another Man" on J.Hud YouTube show.   She played golf in middle school and high school.  

Rapp identifies as bisexual.

Stage

Filmography

Television

Film

Discography

Extended plays

Singles

Awards and nominations

References

External links
 
 

21st-century American actresses
21st-century American singers
21st-century American women singers
Actresses from Charlotte, North Carolina
Actresses from North Carolina
American musical theatre actresses
Living people
Singers from North Carolina
LGBT people from North Carolina
American bisexual actors
American LGBT singers
Bisexual actresses
Bisexual women